Cormocephalus esulcatus is a species of centipede in the Scolopendridae family. It is found in Australia and South Africa, and was first described in 1901 by British zoologist Reginald Innes Pocock.

Distribution
In Australia the species is found in New South Wales and Victoria.

Behaviour
The centipedes are solitary terrestrial predators that inhabit plant litter, soil and rotting wood.

References

 

 
esulcatus
Centipedes of Australia
Arthropods of South Africa
Fauna of New South Wales
Fauna of Victoria (Australia)
Animals described in 1901
Taxa named by R. I. Pocock